Coco Gauff defeated Jeļena Ostapenko in the final, 6–3, 1–6, 6–2 to win the singles tennis title at the 2019 Linz Open. It was her first WTA Tour title. Aged 15 years and 7 months, Gauff became the youngest WTA Tour singles titlist since Nicole Vaidišová (15 years, 5 months) in 2004. Gauff was a lucky loser, only receiving a spot in the main draw because Maria Sakkari withdrew shortly before her first round match. Gauff became only the third player in WTA history to win a tournament as a lucky loser, and the first since Olga Danilović won the 2018 Moscow River Cup.

Camila Giorgi was the reigning champion, but withdrew before the tournament due to injury.

Seeds

Draw

Finals

Top half

Bottom half

Qualifying

Seeds

Qualifiers

Lucky losers

Draw

First qualifier

Second qualifier

Third qualifier

Fourth qualifier

Fifth qualifier

Sixth qualifier

References

External Links
 Main draw
 Qualifying draw

Upper Austria Ladies Linz - Singles
Upper Austria Ladies Linz Singles